The Norton House is a historic house located in northern Swansea, Massachusetts.

Description and history 
It is a -story, wood-framed house, with a typical Georgian five-bay wide front facade and a large central chimney. Its main entrance, centered on the front facade, has sidelight windows and is topped by a Federal period elliptical fan. Built in about 1779, it is one of the older well-preserved houses in northern Swansea. In the early 20th century, it was owned by Benjamin Norton, part owner of a jewelry manufacturing business in nearby Barneyville.

The house was listed on the National Register of Historic Places on February 16, 1990.

See also
National Register of Historic Places listings in Bristol County, Massachusetts

References

Houses in Bristol County, Massachusetts
Swansea, Massachusetts
Houses on the National Register of Historic Places in Bristol County, Massachusetts